The 1991 Boston College Eagles football team represented Boston College in the 1991 NCAA Division I-A football season. The Eagles were led by first-year head coach Tom Coughlin, and played their home games at Alumni Stadium in Chestnut Hill, Massachusetts. They competed as members of the Big East Conference, in the conference's inaugural year of football sponsorship. As a result, Big East members, including Boston College, played a limited conference schedule in order to complete prior scheduling commitments.

Schedule

Roster

References

Boston College
Boston College Eagles football seasons
Boston College Eagles football
Boston College Eagles football